Alexx Ekubo (born Alex Ekubo-Okwaraeke; 10 April 1986) is a Nigerian actor and model. He was first runner up at the 2010 Mr Nigeria contest. He won the Best Actor in a Supporting Role award at the 2013 Best of Nollywood Awards for his role in the Weekend Getaway.

Personal life
Ekubo is a native of Arochukwu, Abia State. He attended the Federal Government College Daura, Katsina State. He studied law at the University of Calabar and later got a diploma in law from Calabar Polytechnic.

On 10 May 2021, Alex Ekubo and his fiancee Fancy Acholonu announced their wedding dates on Instagram. Their traditional wedding was supposed to hold on Saturday 20 November in Imo State, while the white wedding was on the upper  Saturday, 27 November in Lagos State. In August 2021 Alex's fiancée called off their engagement with Fancy Acholonu releasing a statement that their relationship has ended.  he bought his own luxury house of late.

Career
Ekubo's film debut was a minor role in Lancelot Oduwa Imasuen's Sinners in the House (2005); his first major role was in Ladies Men several years later.

Television
Secrets & Scandals 
Hope Bay
Happy Family
Tinsel
AY's Crib
Married to the Game

Filmography
Aina (2011)
Weekend Getaway (2012)
True Citizens (2012)
In the Cupboard (2012)
Dream Walker (2013)
Keeping my Man (2013)
Lagos Cougars (2013)
Champagne (2014)
Single, Married and Complicated (2014)
Ifedolapo (2014)
Gold Diggin (2014) (with Yvonne Nelson and Rukky Sanda)
Undercover Lover (2015)
All that Glitters (2015)
The First Lady (2015) (with Omoni Oboli)
Gbomo Gbomo Express (2015)
Death Toll (2015)
Entreat (2016)
The Other Side of the Coin (2016)
Diary of a Lagos Girl (2016)
Wife Material (2017)
A Man for the Weekend (2017) (with Syndy Emade)
Catcher (2017)
3 is a Crowd (2017)
Hot Girl Next Door (2018)
Switch (2018)
Power of 1 (2018)
The American King: As told by an African Priestess (2019)
Bling Lagosians (2019)
Zero Hour  (2019)
Your Excellency (2019)
72 hours (2019)
Soft Work (2020)
Son of Mercy (2020)
The Blood Covenant

Awards

See also
 List of Nigerian actors

References

External links

Male actors from Abia State
Igbo male actors
University of Calabar alumni
Nigerian male film actors
1986 births
Living people
21st-century Nigerian male actors
Nigerian male models
Male actors in Yoruba cinema
Nigerian male television actors
Nigerian film award winners
Actors from Abia State